François Antoine Vilamitjana (3 August 1846 – 1928) was a French sailor who competed in the 1900 Summer Olympics. He was born in Pau. He was the helmsman of the French boat Martha 1, which won a silver and a bronze medal in the races of the 1 to 2 ton class. He also participated in the Open class with the boat Martha 27, but did not finish the race.

Further reading

References

External links

1846 births
1928 deaths
French male sailors (sport)
Sailors at the 1900 Summer Olympics – 1 to 2 ton
Sailors at the 1900 Summer Olympics – Open class
Olympic sailors of France
Olympic silver medalists for France
Olympic bronze medalists for France
Olympic medalists in sailing
Medalists at the 1900 Summer Olympics
Date of death missing
Place of death missing
Sportspeople from Pau, Pyrénées-Atlantiques